The Journal of the American Oriental Society is a quarterly academic journal published by the American Oriental Society since 1843.

See also

List of theological journals

References

External links

Asian studies journals
Publications established in 1843
Quarterly journals
English-language journals
1843 establishments in the United States